Bonaventura Ibáñez (18 February 1876 – 1 May 1932) was a Spanish film actor of the silent and early sound eras.

Selected filmography
 Wanda Warenine (1917)
 Romola (1924)
 The Faces of Love (1924)
 The Last Lord (1926)
 Croquette (1927)
 The Carnival of Venice (1928)
 Karina the Dancer (1928)
 Kiss Me (1929)
 L'Age d'Or (1930)

References

Bibliography

External links

1876 births
1932 deaths
Spanish male film actors
Spanish male silent film actors
Male actors from Barcelona
20th-century Spanish male actors